Nowabad (also Romanized as Nowābād; also known as Naubād) is a village in Ghazali Rural District, Miyan Jolgeh District, Nishapur County, Razavi Khorasan Province, Iran. At the 2006 census, its population was 403, in 99 families.

References 

Populated places in Nishapur County